Democratic education is a type of formal education that is organized democratically, so that students can manage their own learning and participate in the governance of their school. Democratic education is often specifically emancipatory, with the students' voices being equal to the teacher's.

The history of democratic education spans from at least the 17th century. While it is associated with a number of individuals, there has been no central figure, establishment, or nation that advocated democratic education. The term democratic education originated with The Democratic School of Hadera, which was founded in 1987 in Israel.

History

Enlightenment era
In 1693, John Locke published Some Thoughts Concerning Education. In describing the teaching of children, he declares,

None of the things they are to learn, should ever be made a burthen to them, or impos'd on them as a task. Whatever is so propos'd, presently becomes irksome; the mind takes an aversion to it, though before it were a thing of delight or indifferency. Let a child but be order'd to whip his top at a certain time every day, whether he has or has not a mind to it; let this be but requir'd of him as a duty, wherein he must spend so many hours morning and afternoon, and see whether he will not soon be weary of any play at this rate.

Jean-Jacques Rousseau's book of advice on education, Émile, was first published in 1762. Émile, the imaginary pupil he uses for illustration, was only to learn what he could appreciate as useful. He was to enjoy his lessons, and learn to rely on his own judgement and experience. "The tutor must not lay down precepts, he must let them be discovered," wrote Rousseau, and urged him not make Émile learn science, but let him discover it. He also said that we should not substitute books for personal experience because this does not teach us to reason; it teaches us to use other people's reasoning; it teaches us to believe a great deal but never to know anything.

19th century
While Locke and Rousseau were concerned only with the education of the children of the wealthy, in the 19th century Leo Tolstoy set up a school for peasant children. This was on his own estate at Yasnaya Polyana, Russia, in the late 19th century. He tells us that the school evolved freely from principles introduced by teachers and pupils; that in spite of the preponderating influence of the teacher, the pupil had always had the right not to come to school, or, having come, not to listen to the teacher, and that the teacher had the right not to admit a pupil, and was able to use all the influence he could muster to win over the community, where the children were always in the majority.

20th and 21st century

Dom Sierot
In 1912, Janusz Korczak founded Dom Sierot, the Jewish orphanage in Warsaw, which was run on democratic lines. In 1940 Dom Sierot was forced to move to the Warsaw Ghetto and in 1942 Korczak accompanied all his charges to the gas-chambers of the Treblinka extermination camp.

Influential democratic schools
A Democratic school is a certain kind of alternative free school with a radical emphasis on students democracy and freedom to learn.

The oldest democratic school is Summerhill, in Suffolk, England, founded in 1921. The first democratic school in the United States was the Antioch School in Yellow Springs, Ohio. It was founded in 1921 through Antioch College.

Sudbury Valley School, founded in Framingham, Massachusetts in 1968, has full democratic governance: The School Meeting manages all aspects of the school, including staff hiring and facilities.  A "Sudbury school" is now a general class of school modeled after this original.

The term Democratic Education originates from The Democratic School of Hadera, the first school in the world called a democratic school.
It was founded in Israel in 1987 by Yaacov Hecht. It is a public school.
The term has been embraced by alternative/open schools all over the world, predominantly following the foundation of IDEC – the International Democratic Education Conference, which was first convened at the democratic school in Hadera.

Free schools movement 
In the 1960s, hundreds of "free schools" opened, many based on Summerhill. However A.S. Neill, the founder of Summerhill, distanced himself from American Summerhill schools for not successfully implementing the philosophy of "Freedom, not license."
Free school movement (including many schools based on Summerhill) became a broad movement in the 1960s and 1970s, but was largely renounced by the 1980s. Progressive education and Dewey's ideals did influence them, but only indirectly for the most part.

Networks
Networks supporting democratic education include:
 The Alternative Education Resource Organization launched in 1989 to create a "student-driven, learner-centered approaches to education."
 The annual International Democratic Education Conference, first held in 1993.
 The Australasian Democratic Education Community, which held its first conference in 2002.
 The European Democratic Education Community was founded in 2008, at the first European Democratic Education Conference.
 The Réseau des écoles démocratiques au Québec, or RÉDAQ, was founded in 2012 in order to sponsor the creation of democratic schools in the province of Québec, Canada.
 The Alliance for Self-Directed Education launched in 2016 to make Self-Directed Education a normal and accessible option for all families.
 Democracy Matters, launched in 2009, is a UK alliance of organisations promoting education for citizenship, participation and practical politics

IDEC 2005 named two core beliefs: self-determination and democratic governance. EUDEC has both of these beliefs, and mutual respect is also in their belief statement. IDEN supports schools that self-identify as democratic.

Defining principles
Democratic schools are very diverse but they can all be defined by having two key principles. In other words, it can be said that all democratic schools have these two characteristics in common:

1. Democratic governance: Meetings in which all members of the school community can participate

2. Autonomy for the students to manage their own learning process

Democratic governance
Democratic governance implies the active participation of the entire school community, including the children, in the various collective decision-making processes that define the school. This democratic management can be done in several ways. Most democratic schools make decisions based on a majority vote, while some schools seek to reach consensus and a small selection of democratic schools use Sociocracy for their governance.

Student autonomy
The level of student autonomy and the means of creating it varies widely from school to school. Democratic schools can have different pedagogy, as there are many ways to guarantee and develop student autonomy in the learning process. There are several approaches and pedagogical devices that can be implemented in line with the principles of democratic education.

Variety
Democratic education, similar to democratic government, comes in many different forms. These are some of the areas in which democratic schools differ.

Curriculum
Democratic schools are characterized by involving students in the decision-making process that affects what and how they learn. Democratic schools generally have no mandatory curriculum, considering forced learning to be undemocratic. Some democratic schools officially offer voluntary courses, and many help interested students to prepare for national examinations so they gain qualifications for further study or future employment.

Administrative structure
Democratic schools often have meetings open to all students and staff, where everyone present has a voice and sometimes an equal vote. Some include parents. These school meetings can cover anything from small matters to the appointment or dismissal of staff and the creation or annulment of rules, or to general expenditure and the structure of the school day. At some schools all students are expected to attend these meetings, at others they are voluntary.

Student autonomy
Pedagogical devices that are put into practice in various democratic schools to guarantee and develop students' autonomy in their learning process include:

Project-Based Learning: Students learn through an investigation process structured around complex and authentic issues. Students choose the theme, question or objective to direct and create their project until they reach a final output. In this way, they are the protagonists of their own learning process. Projects can be carried out individually or in groups.
Committees: Teams formed to help in the organization of the school space, in the completion of routine tasks for the health and maintenance of the community. These groups are usually formed during school meetings, according to the needs of the school community.
Study group: Are formed from themes proposed by students and/or educators. They may be questions or topics that they would like to explore. Each group usually has a facilitator or tutor who guides the study process.
Self-assessment: The student evaluates their own learning process, based on criteria defined together with the educator/tutor.
Mentoring: Each student has a mentor, who can work with each student individually or in groups. The mentoring sessions deal with the goals and aspirations of the student and issues that not only focus on academic performance, but also on the relationship with their peers, educators and family.
Study guide: A document planned by the educator to be used by the student inside or outside the school space. It aims to assist students in autonomous study, thus favoring the understanding of concepts, resolution of situations, readings, theoretical and practical deepening, among other aspects of the teaching process and learning.
Unschooling/Self-directed Education: Unschooling is an informal learning that advocates learner-chosen activities as a primary means for learning. Unschoolers learn through their natural life experiences including play, household responsibilities, personal interests and curiosity, internships and work experience, travel, books, elective classes, family, mentors, and social interaction. Self-directed education is education that derives from the self-chosen activities and life experiences of the learner, whether or not those activities were chosen deliberately for the purpose of education.

Other

Finance: Some democratic learning environments are parent-funded, some charity-funded. Schools may have a sliding scale based on family income. Publicly funded democratic schools exist in Canada

Age range: Age mixing is a deliberate policy in some democratic schools. It may include very young children, even babies. Some democratic schools only enroll older students.

Location: Democratic education is not limited to any particular setting. Settings for democratic learning communities include in an office building, on city streets, and in a rural area.

Theory
While types of democratic education are as numerous as types of democracy, a general definition of democratic education is "an education that democratizes learning itself." The goals of democratic education vary according to the participants, the location, and access to resources.

There is no unified body of literature, spanning multiple disciplines, on democratic education. However, there are theories of democratic education from the following perspectives:

Cognitive theory
During the practice theory movement, there was renewed interest in child development. Jean Piaget's theory of universal steps in comprehension and general patterns in the acquisition of knowledge was challenged by experiences at democratic schools. "No two kids ever take the same path. Few are remotely similar. Each child is so unique, so exceptional."

Jean Lave was one of the first and most prominent social anthropologists to discuss cognition within the context of cultural settings presenting a firm argument against the functionalist psychology that many educationalists refer to implicitly.
For Lave, learning is a process undergone by an actor within a specific context. The skills or knowledge learned in one process are not generalizable nor reliably transferred to other areas of human action. Her primary focus was on mathematics in context and mathematics education.

The broader implications reached by Lave and others who specialize in situated learning are that beyond the argument that certain knowledge is necessary to be a member of society (a Durkheimian argument), knowledge learned in the context of a school is not reliably transferable to other contexts of practice.

John Locke argues that children are capable of reasoning at a young age:  "It will perhaps be wonder'd, that I mention reasoning with children; and yet I cannot but think that the true way of dealing with them. They understand it as early as they do language; and, if I misobserve not, they love to be treated as rational creatures, sooner than is imagin'd," Rousseau disagreed: "Use force with children and reasoning with men."

Humans are innately curious, and democratic education supports the belief that the drive to learn is sufficiently strong to motivate children to become effective adults.

Criticism based on cognitive theory
The human brain is not fully developed until adulthood (around the age of 25). A disadvantage of teenagers being responsible for their own education is that "young brains have both fast-growing synapses and sections that remain unconnected. This leaves teens easily influenced by their environment and more prone to impulsive behavior".

Ethics
Democracy can be valued on ethical grounds.

Cultural theory

Democratic education is consistent with the cultural theory that "learning in school must be continuous with life outside of school" and that children should become active participants in the control and organization of their community.

Research on hunter-gatherer societies indicates that free play and exploration were effective transmitters of the societies' culture to children.

According to George Dennison, democratic environments are social regulators: Our desire to cultivate friendships, engender respect, and maintain what George Dennison terms 'natural authority' encourages us to act in socially acceptable ways (i.e. culturally informed practices of fairness, honesty, congeniality, etc.).

Criticism based on cultural theory

Children are influenced by many curricula beyond the school curriculum: TV curricula, advertisers' curricula, curricula of religious communities, Girl Scouts and Boy Scouts, encyclopedias etc. and therefore "one of the most significant tasks any school can undertake is to try to develop in youngsters an awareness of these other curricula and an ability to criticize them…it is utter nonsense to think that by turning children loose in an unplanned and unstructured environment they can be freed in any significant way. Rather, they are thereby abandoned to the blind forces of the hucksters, whose primary concern is neither the children, nor the truth, nor the decent future of ... society."

Émile Durkheim argues that the transition from primitive to modern societies occurred in part as elders made a conscious decision to transmit what were deemed the most essential elements of their culture to the following generations.  He concludes that modern societies are so complex—much more complex than primitive hunter-gatherer societies—and the roles that individuals must fill in society are so varied, that formal mass-education is necessary to instill social solidarity and what he terms 'secular morality'.

Political theory

There are a variety of political components to democratic education. One author identifies those elements as inclusivity and rights, equal participation in decision-making, and equal encouragement for success. The Institute for Democratic Education's principles of democratic education identifies several political principles,
 The interaction between democratic philosophy and education,
 Pluralistic education,
 School administration by means of democratic procedures,
 Education based on respect for human rights,
 Dialogic evaluation,
 Dialogic relationships, and
 Critical social thinking.

Effect on quality of education

The type of political socialization that takes place in democratic schools is strongly related to deliberative democracy theory. Claus Offe and Ulrich Preuss, two theorists of the political culture of deliberative democracies argue that in its cultural production deliberative democracy requires "an open-ended and continuous learning process in which the roles of both 'teacher' and 'curriculum' are missing. In other words, what is to be learned is a matter that we must settle in the process of learning itself."

The political culture of a deliberative democracy and its institutions, they argue, would facilitate more "dialogical forms of making one's voice heard" which would "be achieved within a framework of liberty, within which paternalism is replaced by autonomously adopted self-paternalism, and technocratic elitism by the competent and self-conscious judgment of citizens."

As a curricular, administrative and social operation within schools, democratic education is essentially concerned with equipping people to make "real choices about fundamental aspects of their lives" and happens within and for democracy. It can be "a process where teachers and students work collaboratively to reconstruct curriculum to include everyone." In at least one conception, democratic education teaches students "to participate in consciously reproducing their society, and conscious social reproduction." This role necessitates democratic education happening in a variety of settings and being taught by a variety of people, including "parents, teachers, public officials, and ordinary citizens." Because of this "democratic education begins not only with children who are to be taught but also with citizens who are to be their teachers."

Preparation for life in a democracy

The "strongest, political rationale" for democratic education is that it teaches "the virtues of democratic deliberation for the sake of future citizenship." This type of education is often alluded to in the deliberative democracy literature as fulfilling the necessary and fundamental social and institutional changes necessary to develop a democracy that involves intensive participation in group decision making, negotiation, and social life of consequence.

Civic education

The concept of the hidden curriculum includes the belief that anything taught in an authoritarian setting is implicitly teaching authoritarianism. Thus civic education, if taught in a compulsory setting, undermines its own lessons in democracy. A common belief in democratic schools is that democracy must be experienced to be learned. This argument conforms to the cognition-in-context research by Lave.

Another common belief, which supports the practice of compulsory classes in civic education, is that passing on democratic values requires an imposed structure.

Arguments about how to transmit democracy, and how much and how early to treat children democratically, are made in various literatures concerning student voice, youth participation and other elements of youth empowerment.

Standard progressive visions of education as collaboration tend to downplay the workings of power in society.  If learners are to "develop a democracy," some scholars have argued, they must be provided the tools for transforming the non-democratic aspects of a society.  Democracy in this sense involves not just "participation in decision making," a vision ascribed especially to Dewey, but the ability to confront power with solidarity.

Economic theory
Core features of democratic education align with the emerging consensus on 21st century business and management priorities. Such features include increased collaboration, decentralized organization, and radical creativity.

Curriculum theory
While democratic schools don't have an official curriculum, what each student actually does might be considered their own curriculum.  Dewey was an early advocate of inquiry education, in which student questions and interests shaped curriculum, a sharp contrast to the "factory model" that began to predominate education during the 20th century as standardization became a guiding principle of many educational practices. Although there was a resurgence of inquiry education in the 1980s and 1990s the standards movement of the 21st century and the attendant school reform movement have squashed most attempts at authentic inquiry-oriented democratic education practices. The standards movement has reified standardized tests in literacy and writing, neglecting science inquiry, the arts, and critical literacy.

Democratic schools may not consider only reading, writing and arithmetic to be the real basics for being a successful adult. A.S. Neill said "To hell with arithmetic." Nonetheless, there is a common belief that people will eventually learn "the basics" when they develop internal motivation. Furthermore, an educator implementing inquiry projects will look at the "next steps" in a student's learning and incorporate basic subject matter as needed. This is easier to accomplish in elementary school settings than in secondary school settings, as elementary teachers typically teach all subjects and have large blocks of time that allow for in-depth projects that integrate curriculum from different knowledge domains.

Allen Koshewa conducted research that highlighted the tensions between democratic education and the role of teacher control, showing that children in a fifth grade classroom tried to usurp democratic practices by using undue influence to sway others, much as representative democracies often fail to focus on the common good or protect minority interests. He found that class meetings, service education, saturation in the arts, and an emphasis on interpersonal caring helped overcome some of these challenges. Despite the challenges of inquiry education, classrooms that allow students to make choices about curriculum propel students to not only learn about democracy but also to experience it.

In practice

Play
A striking feature of democratic schools is the ubiquity of play. Students of all ages—but especially the younger ones—often spend most of their time either in free play, or playing games (electronic or otherwise). All attempts to limit, control or direct play must be democratically approved before being implemented. Play is seen as activity every bit as worthy as academic pursuits, often even more valuable. Play is considered essential for learning, particularly in fostering creativity.

Reading, writing and arithmetic

Interest in learning to read happens at a wide variety of ages. Progressive educators emphasise students' choice in reading selections, as well as topics for writing. In addition, Stephen Krashen and other proponents of democratic education emphasise the role of libraries in promoting democratic education. Others, such as children's author Judy Blume, have spoken out against censorship as antagonistic to democratic education, while the school reform movement, which gained traction under the federal initiative 'No Child Left Behind' and later under 'Race to the Top' and the Common Core Standards movement, emphasise strict control over curriculum.

Research into democratic education 

 A study of 12 schools in the United Kingdom by a former school inspector indicates that democratic schooling produces greater motivation to learn and self-esteem among students.
 A study done in Israel indicates that the decline in interest in science that occurs regularly in conventional schools did not occur in democratic schools.
 Three studies done on students of Sudbury schools in the United States of America indicate that students "have been highly successful in their higher education (for those who chose that route) and careers. They have gone on to all walks of life that are valued in our society and report that they feel advantaged because of the sense of personal responsibility, self-control, continued interest in learning, and democratic values they acquired at Sudbury Valley."
 Sands School in the United Kingdom was inspected in 2013 by Ofsted was found to be 'Good' overall with a number of 'Outstanding' features. No area of the provision was found to be less than "good' and all of the Statutory regulations (the school "Standards") were met in full. This is the same outcome as the previous inspection in 2010. Ofsted observed that taking part in decision-making process developed "exceptional qualities of thoughtfulness and the ability to offer balanced arguments". Good pupil achievements were found to be a "consequence of the democratic structures". Personal development was deemed to be "outstanding" because of the exceptional impact of the democratic principles. The inspector was particularly impressed with pupils' behaviour, noting that "lessons took place in an atmosphere of mutual respect" and that "visitors were greeted with interest and impeccable manners".
 Alia College in Melbourne, Australia was in the top 5 Year 9 NAPLAN for Australian schools in Reading, Writing, Grammar and Punctuation abilities.
 Albany Free School, in Albany, United States has treated students with ADHD far better than surrounding schools, giving them enough play time to render medication unnecessary.

Education in a democratic society

As English aristocracy was giving way to democracy, Matthew Arnold investigated popular education in France and other countries to determine what form of education suited a democratic age. Arnold wrote that "the spirit of democracy" is part of "human nature itself", which engages in "the effort to affirm one's own essence...to develop one's own existence fully and freely."

During the industrial age, John Dewey argued that children should not all be given the same pre-determined curriculum. In Democracy and Education he develops a philosophy of education based on democracy. He argues that while children should be active participants in the creation of their education, and while children must experience democracy to learn democracy, they need adult guidance to develop into responsible adults.

Amy Gutmann argues in Democratic Education that in a democratic society, there is a role for everyone in the education of children. These roles are best agreed upon through deliberative democracy.

The journal Democracy and Education investigates "the conceptual foundations, social policies, institutional structures, and teaching/learning practices associated with democratic education." By "democratic education" they mean "educating youth...for active participation in a democratic society."

Yaacov Hecht claims that the Democratic Education, being an education that prepares for life in a democratic culture, it is the missing piece in the intricate puzzle which is the democratic state.

Training programs
Israel's Institute for Democratic Education and Kibbutzim College in Tel Aviv collaborate to offer a Bachelor of Education (B. Ed.) degree with a Specialization Certificate in Democratic Education. Student teaching placements are in both regular schools and democratic schools.

Legal issues

United Nations 

United Nations agreements both support and place restrictions on education options, including democratic education:

Article 26(3) of the United Nations Universal Declaration of Human Rights states that "Parents have a prior right to choose the kind of education that shall be given to their children." While this in itself may allow parents the right to choose democratic education, Articles 28 and 29 of the United Nations Convention on the Rights of the Child place requirements on educational programs: Primary education is compulsory, all aspects of each student must be developed to their full potential, and education must include the development of respect for things such as national values and the natural environment, in a spirit of friendship among all peoples.

Furthermore, while Article 12(1) of the Convention mandates that children be able to have input on all matters that affect them, their input will have limited weight, "due weight in accordance with the age and maturity of the child."

Summerhill

In 1999, Summerhill received a 'notice of complaint' over its policy of non-compulsory lessons, a procedure which would usually have led to closure; Summerhill contested the notice and went before a special educational tribunal. Summerhill was represented by a noted human rights lawyer, Geoffrey Robertson QC. The government's case soon collapsed, and a settlement was offered. This offer was discussed and agreed at a formal school meeting which had been hastily convened in the courtroom from a quorum of pupils and teachers who were present in court. The settlement guaranteed that future inspections of Summerhill would be consistent with Summerhill's educational philosophy.

Theorists
 Joseph Agassi – Israeli philosopher, proponent of democracy
 Michael Apple – social scientist, educational theorist
 Matthew Arnold – English poet, cultural critic, wrote about education in an age of democracy
 Sreyashi Jhumki Basu – American researcher, science educator, author of Democratic Science Teaching
 Pierre Bourdieu – French anthropologist, social theorist
 George Dennison – American writer, author
 John Dewey – American social scientist, progressive education theorist
 Émile Durkheim – French sociologist, functionalist education theorist
 Michel Foucault – French postmodern philosopher
 Peter Gray – American psychologist, studied relationship between education and play
 Daniel Greenberg – "principal philosopher" among the founders of the Sudbury Valley School
 Amy Gutmann – American political scientist, diplomat, president of the University of Pennsylvania
 Yaacov Hecht – Israeli educator, founder of the Democratic School of Hadera, and founder of IDEC
 John Holt – American critic of conventional education, proponent of un-schooling
 Ivan Illich – Austrian philosopher, priest, author of Deschooling Society
 Lawrence Kohlberg – American professor, psychologist, wrote about moral and democratic education
 Homer Lane – American-English educator, founder of the Ford Republic (1907–12) and the Little Commonwealth (1913–17)
 Deborah Meier – founder of democratic schools in New York and Boston, writer, leader of the small schools movement
 A. S. Neill – Scottish educator and author, founder of the Summerhill School
 Claus Offe – German political sociologist, theorist of deliberative democratic culture 
 Karl Popper – Austrian-British philosopher of science
 Bertrand Russell – British philosopher, author of On Education and founder of Beacon House School

See also
 Alternative education
 Anarchism and education
 Constructivism (philosophy of education)
 Dialogic learning
 European Democratic Education Community
 European Democratic Education Conference
 Hidden curriculum
 Human rights education
 International Democratic Education Conference
 List of democratic schools
 List of Sudbury schools
 Progressive education
 Rouge Forum
 Taking Children Seriously

Citations 

 Apple, M. (1993) Official Knowledge: Democratic Education in a Conservative Age. Routledge.
 Blume Judy. (2013) https://www.indexoncensorship.org/2013/09/judy-blume-banned-books/
 Bourdieu, Pierre. (1984) Distinction: A Social Critique of the Judgment of Taste. London: Routledge.
 Bourdieu, Pierre and Jean-Claude Passeron. (1990) Reproduction in Education, Society and Culture. Theory, Culture and Society Series. Sage.
 Carlson, D. and Apple, M.W. (1998) Power, Knowledge, Pedagogy: The Meaning of Democratic Education in Unsettling Times. Westview Press.
 Carr, W. and Hartnett, A. (1996) Education and the Struggle for Democracy: The politics of educational ideas. Open University Press.
 Dennison, George. (1999) The Lives of Children: The Story of the First Street School. Portsmouth, NH: Boynton/Cook Publishers.
 Dewey, John. (1916) Democracy and Education. New York: Macmillan.
 Dewey, John. (1997) Experience and Education. New York: Touchstone.
 Durkheim, Émile. (2002) Moral Education. Mineola, NY: Dover.
 Foucault, Michel. (1991) Discipline and Punish: The Birth of the Prison. New York: Random House.
 Gatto, John Taylor. (1992) Dumbing Us Down: The Hidden Curriculum of Compulsory Education. Philadelphia, PA: New Society.
 Giroux, H. A. (1989) 'Schooling for Democracy: Critical pedagogy in the modern age. Routledge.
 Gutmann, A. (1999) Democratic Education. Princeton University Press.
 Habermas, Jürgen. (1997) "Popular Sovereignty as Procedure' "Deliberative Democracy". Bohman, James and William Rehg, eds. Cambridge, MA: MIT Press.
 Hecht, Yaacov. (2011) Democratic Education – A Beginning of a Story
 Held, David. (2006) Models of Democracy. Stanford: Stanford University Press.
 Jensen, Knud and Walker, Stephen eds. (1989) "Towards Democratic Schooling: European Experiences". Open University Press
 Kahn, Robert L. and Daniel Katz. (1978) The Social Psychology of Organizations. New York: John Wiley and Sons.
 Kelly, A. V. (1995) Education and Democracy: Principles and practices. Paul Chapman Publishers.
 Knoester, M. (2012) Democratic Education in Practice: Inside the Mission Hill School. Teachers College Press.
 Koshewa, Allen (1999). Discipline and Democracy: Teachers on Trial. Portsmouth, NH: Heinemann.
 Krashen, Stephen. (2014). The Common Core: A Disaster for Libraries, A Disaster for Language Arts, a Disaster for American Education. "Knowledge Quest" 42(3): 37–45.
 Manin, Bernard. "On Legitimacy and Political Deliberation" Elly Stein and Jane Mansbridge, trans. Political Theory. Vol. 15, No. 3, Aug. 1987: 338–368.
 Miller, Ron. (2002) "Free Schools, Free People: Education and Democracy After the 1960s". SUNY Press
 Neill, A. S. (1995) Summerhill School: A New View of Childhood. Ed. Albert Lamb. New York: St. Martin's Griffin.
 Sadofsky, Mimsy and Daniel Greenberg. (1994) Kingdom of Childhood: Growing up at Sudbury Valley School. Hanna Greenberg, interviewer. Framingham, MA: Sudbury Valley School Press.
 Schutz, Aaron. (2010). Social Class, Social Action, and Education: The Failure of Progressive Democracy. New York: Palgrave Macmillan. introduction
 Short, Kathy, Jerome Harste, and Carolyn Burke. (1996) Creating Classrooms for Authors and Inquirers, 2nd Edition. Portsmouth, NH: Heinemann.

External links

 Peter Gray @ Psychology Today
 Comprehensive Global List of Democratic Schools (via AERO)
 European Democratic Education Community (EUDEC)
 Institute for Democratic Education in America (IDEA)
 Democracy Education and the Canadian Voting Age

 
Education reform
Experiential learning
Alternative education
Applied learning
School types
Pedagogy
Democracy
Group decision-making